Pic de Sanfonts is a mountain in the Pyrenees on the border of Spain and northwest Andorra. The nearest town is Arinsal, La Massana. It is a subpeak of, and 1.2 km southwest of, Coma Pedrosa (2942 m), the highest mountain in Andorra.

References

Mountains of Andorra
Mountains of Catalonia
Mountains of the Pyrenees
Andorra–Spain border
International mountains of Europe
Two-thousanders of Andorra
Two-thousanders of Spain